Gastón Amadeo Rossi (born 31 January 1990) is an Argentine professional footballer who plays as a winger for Sportivo Patria.

Career
After coming through the youth categories of Boca Juniors, Rossi was promoted to their first team under manager Claudio Borghi. During the winter break of the 2010–11 season, Rossi spent a few weeks on trial with Serbian club Partizan, alongside his teammate Leandro Rodrigo Kuszko. In the summer of 2011, Rossi was loaned to Chacarita Juniors. In the summer of 2012, Rossi moved on loan to Patronato.

References

External links
 
 
 

Club Almirante Brown footballers
Argentine footballers
Association football midfielders
Boca Juniors footballers
Chacarita Juniors footballers
Club Atlético Patronato footballers
Sportivo Patria footballers
1990 births
Living people
Sportspeople from Buenos Aires Province